Gutka, ghutka, guṭkha or betel quid is a chewing tobacco preparation made of crushed areca nut (also called betel nut), tobacco, catechu, paraffin wax, slaked lime (Calcium hydroxide) and sweet or savory flavourings, in India, Pakistan, other Asian countries, and North America.

It contains carcinogens, is considered responsible for oral cancer and other severe negative health effects and hence is subjected in India to the same restrictions and warnings as cigarettes. Highly addictive and a known carcinogen, gutkha is the subject of much controversy in India. Many states have sought to curb its immense popularity by taxing sales of gutkha heavily or by banning it. Gutka is manufactured in the sub-continent and exported to a few other countries, often marketed under the guise of a "safer" product than cigarettes and tobacco. Reported to have both stimulant and relaxation effects, it is sold throughout South Asia and some Pacific regions in small, individual-sized foil packets/sachets and tins that cost between 2 and 10 rupees each. It is widely consumed in India, Karachi city of Pakistan and the Madhesh region of Nepal. Gutka is consumed by placing a pinch of it between the gum and cheek and gently sucking and chewing, similar to chewing tobacco.

Characteristics 
Gutka is a commercially produced form of smokeless tobacco. Manufacturers add sweet or savory flavors, making it more appealing to women and young people in some locations. The combinations of gutka ingredients vary according to local preferences. Spices may include mustard, turmeric, anise seeds, cardamom, saffron and cloves.

In addition to areca nut, nicotine, slaked lime, paraffin and catechu, it can be laced with thousands of chemicals. It is a powdery, granular, light brownish to white substance. Within moments of chewing mixing with saliva, the gutkha begins to dissolve and turn deep red in colour. It may impart upon its user a "buzz" somewhat more intense than that of tobacco chewing, snuffing and smoking.

Effects 

Creative advertising by tobacco companies and lack of accessible information for the public leads to many gutka users being unaware of the dangers it can bring. Often users believe that gutka can act as a digestion aid, kill germs, and generally give a sense of well being. In fact 34.4% of smokers have switched to smokeless tobacco use as way to quit.

In addition to cancer of the head, mouth, neck, throat, oesophagus, other aerodigestive tract cancers, and dental disease, areca nut, the main ingredient in gutka, is known to cause severe oral mucosal disorders. Oral submucous fibrosis, one such disorder, is a malignant condition that is severely debilitating and has no cure. Metabolic syndrome, hypertension, diabetes and obesity have also been linked to its use. Use by pregnant women increases the risk of low birth rates in newborns. As of 2015 it was the fourth most common addictive product worldwide. Areca nut "quid chewing has claimed to produce a sense of well being, euphoria, warm sensations of the body, sweating, salivation, palpitation and heightened alertness, tolerance to hunger, and increased capacity and stamina to work."

When a person chews gutka, the mixture directly enters the system through the oral cavity, which absorbs about 28 carcinogenic chemicals including nicotine.

"Smokeless tobacco use is highly addictive. The nicotine in smokeless tobacco is more easily absorbed than by smoking cigarettes enhancing its addictiveness."

Gutka turns saliva bright red, and when it is chewed long and often enough it will stain a user's teeth bright red too. Saliva is generally spat onto a wall or at the ground, causing a red stain that is quite resistant to the elements. Some building owners have taken to combating this by painting murals of gods on their walls, with the idea that gutkha chewers would not spit on a god.

Usage 
Use of gutka and other forms of tobacco are culturally ingrained and use can begin at a young age. Smokeless tobacco use is most common in India where oral cancer accounts for 30 to 40% of cancer cases. Its use has been reported in Thailand, Sri Lanka, Bangladesh, Pakistan, Malaysia, Cambodia, China, Indonesia and New Guinea. Immigrants to the United Kingdom, parts of Africa, Australia, North America have brought their habits with them. Gutka is readily available in these locations, especially in neighborhood Asian markets in highly populated areas. Immigrants to the United States where spitting in public is not as socially acceptable, learn to be discreet. Those in the lower socioeconomic populations are especially at risk. It is here that access to education and treatment is limited. Easy access and extremely low cost lead to early addiction and the prevalence of gutka use. Precancerous lesions have been observed in young children and symptoms of cancer often appear by high school or college age. Smoking is not allowed in many places, and when done by children, is disapproved of. In contrast gutka use, being all but invisible to others, is the method of choice. A New York Times article reported in 2002 that sales of gutka and the tobaccoless version, paan masala, reached $1 billion a year.

India 
Over 25% of India's population use tobacco products including cigarettes and multiple forms of smokeless tobacco. India has the largest number of smokeless tobacco users in the world. The poorest populations are greatly affected due to the detrimental effects of its use and the subsequent costs of medical care. Many Indian states have sought to curb the use and spread of gutka by taxing sales heavily or by banning it.

They have banned the sale, manufacture, distribution and storage of gutka and all its variants. As of May 2013, gutka is banned in 24 states and 3 union territories. The federal Food Safety and Regulation (Prohibition) Act 2011 allows harmful products such as gutka to be banned for a year. This can be renewed annually, resulting in a permanent ban. The ban is enforced by the state public health ministry, the state Food and Drug Administration, and the local police. Enforcement of the law is generally lax and many shops still sell gutka, although it may not be displayed. Enforcemnent is stricter in some regions like Mumbai and Delhi, but illegal sale of gutka still occurs.

In 2019, the Delhi government extended the ban for one more year on Gutka, Pan Masala, Flavoured/Scented Tobacco, Kharra and similar products containing tobacco. In September 2012, State of Delhi banned Gutka and Pan Masala containing tobacco and/or nicotine. After the notification, Gutka manufacturers separated the components like tobacco from Gutka and Pan Masala. Since the term ‘Gutka and Pan Masala Containing Tobacco’ was used in the notification. The components like tobacco were manufactured and sold in separate pouches after the ban. The notification was revised in March 2015 to make it more strict and banned all smokeless tobacco (SLT) products including twin-pack. Offenders can be fined or receive prison sentences. The law has provisions of imposing fines up to 25,000 Indian rupees on the sale of products that are injurious to health.

Research firm Edelweiss estimates the gutka ban will cause the industry 15-20 billion rupees in losses.

Advertising 
Like alcohol and tobacco products, there is a ban on advertisement of gutka. Often tobacco companies advertise gutka as pan masala in order to skirt the ban on advertising tobacco products. Surrogate advertisements often use pan masala ads to promote gutka products with similar name and packaging.

According to the Food Safety and Standards (Prohibition and Restriction on Sales) Regulations, 2011 of the Food Safety and Standards Authority of India, misleading advertisement of such products invites a fine of 1,000,000 rupees.

According to StraitsResearch, The India pan masala market is expected to reach USD 10,365 million by 2026 at the CAGR of 10.4% during the forecast period 2019–2026. The India pan masala market is driven by significant switching of consumers from tobacco products to pan masala, aggressive advertising and convenient packaging, and Maharashtra State’s revocation of the ban over pan masala products.

Notes

References 
 Javed F, Altamash M, Klinge B, Engström PE. (2008). Periodontal conditions and oral symptoms in gutka-chewers with and without type 2 diabetes. Acta Odontol Scand; 66(5):268-73.
 Javed F, Chotai M, Mehmood A, Almas K. Oral mucosal disorders associated with habitual gutka usage. Oral Surg Oral Med Oral Pathol Oral Radiol Endod 2010;109:857-64.
 Javed F, Bello Correa FO, Chotai M, Tappuni AR, Almas K. Systemic conditions associated with areca nut usage: A literature review. Scand J Public Health 2010; 38: 838–44.

External links 
 Sweet but Deadly Addiction is Seizing the Young in India, The New York Times, 13 August 2002
 Chewing tobacco cancer warning, BBC News, 26 July 1999
 Health: Children Buy Cancerous Sweets, BBC News, 3 March 1999
 Anti Gutkha Campaign, Cancer Patients Aid Association
 Ruaab Pan Masala, Gutka, 16 July 2018

Chewing tobacco brands
Tobacco in India
Tobacco in Pakistan
Herbal and fungal stimulants
Desi culture
Masticatories
IARC Group 1 carcinogens